Nika King is an American actress and comedian. She is best known for her role as Leslie Bennett on the HBO television series Euphoria (2019–present). After starting her acting career in 2002, King moved to Los Angeles and became a stand-up comedian.

Early life
King has five siblings. She grew up in Miami and, when King was a child, her parents and uncle were addicted to drugs. She attended Miami Carol City Senior High School, where she was president of her class, and graduated from University of Florida with a degree in theater. King briefly lived in New York City to become an actor, but soon moved back to Miami due to feeling overwhelmed. She then worked as a drama and dance teacher and a basketball coach at Miami Carol City Senior High School for two years. Although she initially planned to quit after her first year, she decided to stay for another year after the September 11 attacks.

Career
While in Miami, King made her first acting appearance in the television movie Miss Miami in 2002, where she played the chief of police. After quitting her job as a teacher, King moved to Los Angeles to pursue acting full-time and enrolled at The Groundlings School. She performed with Elite Delta Force 3, an all-Black female sketch comedy group, before transitioning into stand-up comedy. She had a recurring role on the OWN television series Greenleaf from 2016 to 2017 as Ramona Chapman. She also made guest appearances on various television series, including 2 Broke Girls, Hannah Montana, Best Friends Whenever, and NCIS: Los Angeles.

In 2019, King began starring in the HBO teen drama television series Euphoria as Leslie Bennett, the widowed single mother of teenage drug addict Rue and Rue's sister, Gia. Sam Levinson, the show's creator, envisioned Leslie as a representation of his own mother. King originally joined the cast of the series in a supporting role, but was soon given a leading role. For her role on the show, she drew on experiences her mother had when she was addicted to drugs and worked with a private acting coach. She signed a contract with Paradigm Talent Agency for representation in 2020, and signed a contract with Wonder Street for management in 2022. She directed the upcoming short film For Sale.

At the beginning of the COVID-19 pandemic, King launched the startup Jeli Life, an online mentorship program for marginalized communities in the entertainment industry. She also founded the 501(c)(3) organization Rose of Sharon, which focuses on improving mental health in the Black community.

Personal life
King's mother is a three-time cancer survivor.

Filmography

Film

Television

References

External links
 

Living people
21st-century American actresses
21st-century American comedians
Actresses from Miami
African-American actresses
African-American female comedians
American women comedians
Miami Carol City Senior High School alumni
University of Florida alumni
American nonprofit executives
Women nonprofit executives
Place of birth missing (living people)
Year of birth missing (living people)